William Harry McGarry (10 June 1927 – 15 March 2005) was an England international association footballer and manager who spent 40 years in the professional game. He had a reputation for toughness, both as a player and as a manager.

A right-half as a player, he joined Port Vale following the end of World War II, and spent the next six years with the club. He then moved on to Huddersfield Town in 1951, where he would spend the next ten years of his career. He was an ever-present as Town won promotion out of the Second Division in 1952–53. He retired in 1963, after spending two years as Bournemouth & Boscombe Athletic's player-manager. In all he scored 33 goals in 617 league and cup games in an eighteen-year career in the Football League. After winning one England "B" cap in 1954, he went on to win four senior England caps.

He also found success as a manager, moving from Bournemouth to Watford in 1963, he was appointed as Ipswich Town manager the following year. There he led the club to the Second Division championship in 1967–68, before moving on to the vacant position at Wolverhampton Wanderers later in 1968. He spent eight years with "Wolves", leading them to the UEFA Cup final in 1972 and to League Cup glory in 1974. He became an international manager with Saudi Arabia in 1976, only to return to the domestic game with Newcastle United the following year. He failed to find success at Newcastle, and left the club in 1980, before finding work in Zambia with Power Dynamos FC. He spent two months as Wolves manager in 1985, before leaving his management career behind him. After a long battle against illness, he died on 15 March 2005, aged 77. He had one son and one daughter.

Early and personal life
William Harry McGarry was born on 10 June 1927 in Stoke-on-Trent, Staffordshire to Ralph and Ethel (née Vernon). He married Constance Dale in 1950.

Club career
McGarry began his career at local non-league club Northwood Mission, based in Hanley, before joining David Pratt's Port Vale as an amateur in April 1945, signing professional forms in June of that year. He was handed his debut by Billy Frith at the Old Recreation Ground on boxing day 1945, in a 1–0 defeat by Walsall. Under Gordon Hodgson's stewardship, he played seven Third Division South games in the 1946–47 season. He forced his way into the first eleven by November 1947, and scored his first goal on boxing day in a 5–0 win over Brighton & Hove Albion. He played a total of 27 games in the 1947–48 campaign. He featured 41 times in the 1948–49 season, scoring one goal against Torquay United. He was an ever-present throughout the 46 game 1949–50 season, and found the net once on the final day of the season, in a 2–1 defeat to Ipswich Town at Portman Road. He played 35 games in the 1950–51 season, and scored in games away at Millwall and Torquay, before he was sold on to First Division side Huddersfield Town for a £12,000 fee in March 1951.

"Terriers" manager George Stephenson bought McGarry to play in a defensive partnership with Laurie Kelly. He built a reputation as a tough-tackling, sturdy wing-half, and featured ten times towards the end of the 1950–51 season. He then scored twice in 43 games in 1951–52, as Huddersfield suffered relegation. New boss Andy Beattie led the club to immediate promotion out of the Second Division with a second-place finish in 1952–53. McGarry played all 44 games, in an extremely settled defence that featured himself, Kelly, Don McEvoy, Len Quested, Ron Staniforth, and goalkeeper Jack Wheeler; remarkably, the six men played every minute of the campaign, and had the best defensive record in the Football League with just 33 goals conceded in 42 league games. Town's solid defence then helped them to finish third in the top-flight in 1953–54, just six points behind champions Wolverhampton Wanderers; McGarry was again an ever-present, scoring four goals in 43 appearances. He then scored once in 38 games in 1954–55, as Town posted a 12th-place finish. He then scored four goals in 41 games in 1955–56, as their once solid defence leaked goals and cost them relegation as they finished below 20th place Aston Villa on goal average. Bill Shankly took charge at Leeds Road in November 1956, and took the club to 12th in the Second Division in 1956–57; he kept faith with McGarry, who scored twice in 36 appearances. He scored six goals in 36 games in 1957–58, as Huddersfield rose slightly to ninth place. His goal tally included a successfully converted penalty in the 7–6 defeat to Charlton Athletic at The Valley on 21 December; ten-man Charlton came back from 5–1 down in what The Guardian described as "the most remarkable comeback in football history". They then dropped down to 14th in 1958–59, with McGarry scoring four goals in 32 games. He scored once in 38 games in 1959–60; Town posted a sixth-place finish under new boss Eddie Boot, who took charge after Shankly left the club to manage Liverpool. McGarry scored once in 20 appearances in 1960–61, as Town dropped down to 20th place.

After a decade of service at Huddersfield Town, he headed south to become Bournemouth & Boscombe Athletic's first player-manager. He was signed for a £2,000 fee. He spent two years at Dean Court, scoring twice in 78 league games, before hanging up his boots and devoting himself to management.

International career
McGarry's performances at Huddersfield won him first an England "B" appearance, and then a place in the England squad for the 1954 World Cup. Despite having never featured for the national team before, he played two of England's three games in the tournament (against hosts Switzerland and Uruguay). He won two further caps the following year in a 5–1 victory over Denmark and in a Home International 2–1 defeat by Wales. He also played for the Football League and went on the FA's 1956 South African tour.

Style of play
Former teammate Roy Sproson said that: "he was everything that a manager could want in a player. Magnificently fit, Bill was aggressive, busy, good in the air and a player of tremendous enthusiasm for the game. He gave 100 per cent effort for all of 90 minutes" and that he also used to "underrate himself". Freddie Steele stated that "McGarry is a tough bugger. He wasn't born, you know – he was cast at Shelton Bar!".

Management career

Bournemouth & Boscombe Athletic
His post as player-manager as Don Welsh's successor at Bournemouth & Boscombe Athletic in 1961 was the start of a long career in management for McGarry. He led the "Cherries" to a third-place finish in the Third Division in 1961–62, just three points behind promoted Grimsby Town. They went on to finish in fifth place in 1962–63, six points behind promoted Swindon Town, in his final season at Dean Court.

Watford
In July 1963, McGarry took the reins at Watford following the dismissal of Ron Burgess. He took the "Hornets" to third in the Third Division in 1963–64, his only full season in charge at Vicarage Road. They finished just two points behind Coventry City and Crystal Palace, who were both promoted.

Ipswich Town
McGarry left Watford (who appointed Ken Furphy in his place) to take charge at recently relegated Ipswich Town in October 1964, following Jackie Milburn's brief and unsuccessful tenure. He led the "Blues" to a fifth-place finish in the Second Division in 1964–65. However they dropped to 15th place in 1965–66, before posting another fifth-place finish in 1966–67 after he signed proven forward Ray Crawford. He finally won promotion as a manager in 1967–68, when he took the Portman Road outfit back to the First Division. Ipswich won the Second Division title, though were only one point clear of third place Blackpool. One of McGarry's signings was Charlie Woods who later became coach at Ipswich Town.

Wolverhampton Wanderers
Just months into the 1968–69 campaign, he walked out on Ipswich (who appointed Bobby Robson in his stead) to take charge at fellow First Division club Wolverhampton Wanderers, who had just sacked his former teammate Ronnie Allen. He appointed Sammy Chung as his assistant, who he had previously taken on at Ipswich. He built a team around speedy winger Dave Wagstaffe, central midfield duo Mike Bailey and Kenny Hibbitt, and strike partners Derek Dougan and John Richards.

After a 16th-place finish in 1968–69, he took Wolves to 13th place in 1969–70 and then up to fourth place in 1970–71. They won the first ever instalment of the Texaco Cup, in 1971, with a 3–2 victory over Heart of Midlothian. They dropped to ninth in the league in 1971–72, but went all the way to the UEFA Cup final, recording victories over Juventus and Ferencvárosi. They lost 2–1 to Tottenham Hotspur in the home leg of the final and could only manage a 1–1 draw at White Hart Lane, and were thereby denied European silverware.

They again qualified for Europe following a fifth-place finish in 1972–73, and McGarry also led the club to the semi-finals of both the FA Cup and League Cup. They were beaten 1–0 by Leeds United at Maine Road in the FA Cup, and lost 4–3 on aggregate to Tottenham Hotspur in the League Cup. They dropped to 12th place in 1973–74, but finally won a major trophy after beating Manchester City 2–1 in the League Cup final at Wembley. He later admitted that he would have resigned had Wolves lost in the final. Wolves dropped back down to 12th in 1974–75, though they did record a 7–1 win over Chelsea at Molineux. However the club suffered relegation at the end of the 1975–76 season, and McGarry was promptly fired after nearly eight years at the helm. He was replaced by long-time assistant Sammy Chung.

Newcastle United via Saudi Arabia
He headed abroad and replaced Ferenc Puskás as coach of the Saudi Arabia national team, but soon returned to England. Port Vale tried to hire him after sacking Roy Sproson in October 1977, but he rejected their terms. He was appointed as manager of Newcastle United the following month, after Richard Dinnis's brief and unsuccessful reign at St James' Park. He gave Kenny Wharton his first professional contract, who would go on to play for the club for eleven years. He also signed Peter Withe, Alan Shoulder, and Bobby Shinton. He could not stop the "Magpies" suffering relegation out of the First Division in the 1977–78 season. He could only take United to two mid-table finishes in the Second Division in 1978–79 and 1979–80, before he was fired just weeks into the 1980–81 season after his team were knocked out of the League Cup by Third Division club Bury. Arthur Cox was appointed as his successor.

Later career
McGarry then served in a variety of posts, with spells as a scout at Brighton & Hove Albion, Zambian Power Dynamos FC as a coach, the Zambian national team as manager, and a period as a coach in South Africa. He returned to former club Wolves in September 1985, but walked out after just 61 days after a fall-out with the Bhatti Brothers. After a spell outside the game, he returned to South Africa and coached in Bophuthatswana.

Style of management
Journalist Pat Murphy described McGarry as a "fearsome character when crossed" who was a "hard taskmaster". Murphy and Alan Oliver both noted that McGarry could often give journalists a hard time. Former Wolves player Kenny Hibbitt said that "I didn't necessarily like him, but I respected him." He also instigated rules on players diet, long before the trend became standard practice within the footballing world.

Career statistics

Source:

Club statistics

International statistics

Managerial statistics

Notes
Statistics at Saudi Arabia, Power Dynamos & Zambia not known.

Honours

Player
Huddersfield Town
Football League Second Division second-place promotion: 1952–53

Manager
Ipswich Town
Football League Second Division: 1967–68

Wolverhampton Wanderers
Texaco Cup: 1971
UEFA Cup runners-up: 1972
League Cup: 1974

References

1927 births
2005 deaths
Footballers from Stoke-on-Trent
English footballers
England international footballers
England B international footballers
Association football wing halves
AFC Bournemouth players
Huddersfield Town A.F.C. players
Port Vale F.C. players
English Football League players
1954 FIFA World Cup players
Association football player-managers
English football managers
AFC Bournemouth managers
Watford F.C. managers
Ipswich Town F.C. managers
Wolverhampton Wanderers F.C. managers
Expatriate football managers in Saudi Arabia
Saudi Arabia national football team managers
Newcastle United F.C. managers
Expatriate football managers in Zambia
Zambia national football team managers
English Football League managers
English expatriates in South Africa
English Football League representative players
Association football coaches
Association football scouts
Brighton & Hove Albion F.C. non-playing staff